is a Japanese diplomat.

Ebihara started his diplomatic career in 1971, as quit the University of Tokyo and entered the Ministry of Foreign Affairs, and served as Deputy Director General of the Bureau of Middle Eastern and African Affairs, Director General of the Bureau of North American Affairs, and Executive Secretary to the Prime Minister. 
In 2006-2008 served as Ambassador to Indonesia. In 2008-2011 served as Japanese Ambassador to the United Kingdom.

External links
 Basic information, from the website of the Japanese Embassy in the UK

References

Living people
1948 births
Ambassadors of Japan to Indonesia
Ambassadors of Japan to the United Kingdom
University of Tokyo alumni